Kidaman Creek is a rural locality in the Sunshine Coast Region, Queensland, Australia. In the  Kidaman Creek had a population of 130 people.

Geography
Obi Obi Creek, a tributary of the Mary River, runs through the north-east of the locality.

History 

Kidaman Creek was formerly a locality in Caloundra City and a district in Maroochy Shire.

Kidaman (or Kidamann) Creek State School opened in 1914 and closed about 1958.

A postal receiving office opened on 20 November 1922 with a post office opening on 1 July 1927. The post office closed on 31 December 1930.

In the  Kidaman Creek had a population of 130 people.

References

External links 

Suburbs of the Sunshine Coast Region
Localities in Queensland